Carex ceylanica is a tussock-forming species of perennial sedge in the family Cyperaceae. It is native to parts of Sri Lanka.

The species was first formally described by the botanist Johann Otto Boeckeler in 1876 as a part of the work Linnaea.

See also
List of Carex species

References

ceylanica
Taxa named by Johann Otto Boeckeler
Plants described in 1876
Flora of Sri Lanka